Hartley is a ghost town located in South Australia, along the Bremer River on the Strathalbyn-Callington Road.

Founded in 1853 as a small rural settlement, it once boasted a Methodist church (1856), post office (opened 1869 and closed 1981), school (opened 1919 and closed 1970) and creamery. Now the town is little more than a series of ruins and farm houses.

References

 Hartley listed in the Manning Index of South Australian History

Hartley
Hartley